Tridev is a 1989 Indian action thriller film directed by Rajiv Rai. It stars Sunny Deol, Naseeruddin Shah, Jackie Shroff, Madhuri Dixit, Sangeeta Bijlani, Sonam, Anupam Kher and Amrish Puri.

The film was critically and commercially successful at the box office and was third highest-grossing film of 1989 behind Maine Pyar Kiya and Ram Lakhan and won three Filmfare Awards  at the 35th Filmfare Awards in 1990. The film was remade in Telugu as Nakshatra Poratam, with Suman Talwar, Bhanuchander Prasad and Arun Pandian.

Plot
Powerful crime lord Bhujang has an honest politician assassinated on behalf of his arms supplier. Inspector Karan, the son of a respected judge is hired for the case. Divya, his fiancé and the daughter of Commissioner Arvind, has a brother Ravi, the hot-headed black sheep of the family. Bhujang kills Karan's father and Ramesh. Arvind knows Karan's honesty, but transfers him to a village due to pressure. At the new post, Karan meets Jai Singh whose father was killed by dacoit Bhairav, who is in fact Bhujang.

Bhujang invites Ravi to join his gang. As Arvind plans to bring Karan back, Bhujang sends goons and Ravi to kill him. They trap Karan, but he escapes with a knife's help which Ravi gave him. Ravi later meets Natasha, Ramesh's sister who is collecting proofs of Bhujang's crimes. Renuka, an actress who Jai met earlier, hires him as a bodyguard. She's the daughter of a corrupt politician, who works with Bhujang and plans her marriage to his son. Jai meets and recognizes Bhujang as his father's murderer.

Karan and Ravi vow to destroy Bhujang's plans. When he plans to rob a global bank, Ravi informs Karan. Jai takes Renuka to the bank to expose her father's misdeeds too. Foiling the robbery, Karan kills Bhujang's son. He captures Natasha, Renuka, Divya, Arvind and policemen and frames Karan, Ravi and Jai. The three fight and kill Bhujang, after freeing Divya, Natasha, Renuka, Arvind and the policemen. Karan-Divya, Ravi-Natasha and Jai-Renuka finally unite and rejoice.

Cast
 Naseeruddin Shah as Jai Singh
 Sunny Deol as Inspector Karan Saxena
 Jackie Shroff as Ravi Mathur
 Madhuri Dixit as Divya Mathur
 Sangeeta Bijlani as Natasha Tejani
 Sonam Rai as Renuka
 Shekhar Suman as Shrikant Verma
 Amrish Puri as Bhairav Singh / Bhujang
 Anupam Kher as Commissioner Mathur
 Raza Murad as Mantriji
 Dalip Tahil as Don
 Sharat Saxena as Inspector Suraj Singh
 Tej Sapru as Bhujang's Son Goga
 Dan Dhanoa as Bhujang's Son Ranga
 Rajesh Vivek as Raghav
 Anjana Mumtaz as Sudha Mathur
 Yunus Parvez as Film Director
 Subbiraj Kakkar as Judge Saxena
 Satyajeet Puri as Inspector Tripathi
 Vijayendra Ghatge as Ramesh Tejani
 Ajit Vachhani as Don's Lawyer
 Sulabha Deshpande as Jai Singh's Aunty, cameo appearance 
 Gavin Packard as Mr Dunhill
 Chandrashekhar as Minister Laxmandas
 Javed Khan Amrohi as Ramu

Accolades 
At the 35th Filmfare Awards, Tridev won two awards from six nominations.

Music
The music was given by Kalyanji–Anandji, arrangements by Viju Shah and the lyrics by Anand Bakshi. The songs of this album like "Main Teri Mohabbat Main", "Tirchi Topiwale", "Gali Gali Main Phirta Hai", "Gajar Ne Kiya Hai Ishara" and "Rat Bhar Jaam Se" were very popular. "Oye Oye" samples 'Rhythm is Gonna Get You' by Miami Sound Machine and the Tridev theme is directly copied from "One More Chance" by Pet Shop Boys. The song "Oye Oye" was used twice in movies Double Dhamaal and Azhar, the song "Gail Gali Main Phirta Hai" is used in Hindi dubbed version of Kannada-language movie K.G.F: Chapter 1.

Reboot
In 2022, it was officially announced that a reboot tentatively "Tridev - Doosra Adhyaay" is in making.

On 8 August 2022, it was revealed that Tridev remake with Salman Khan is not happening.

References

External links
 

Trimurti Films
1989 films
1980s Hindi-language films
Indian action films
Films scored by Kalyanji Anandji
Films directed by Rajiv Rai
1989 action films
Hindi-language action films